Alex Kofi Agyekum (born August 18, 1962) is a Ghanaian politician and member of the Seventh Parliament of the Fourth Republic of Ghana representing the Mpohor Constituency in the Western Region on the ticket of the New Patriotic Party.

Early life and education 
Agyekum was born on August 18, 1962. He obtained a BA from the University of Cape Coast as well as an M.ED in Management and a diploma in Education.

Career 
Agyekum was a teaching and research assistant at University of Cape Coast from 1991 to 1992. He was the head of the department for economics in Holy Child School from 1993 to 2003. He was the assistant headmaster at Holy Child School from 2003 to 2013.

Politics 
Agyekum entered parliament on 7 January 2013 as a member of parliament for the Mpohor Constituency on the ticket of the New Patriotic Party. He has remained in parliament, winning the subsequent elections (2012 and 2016) since 2012.

He was elected by parliament as the chairman of the youth, sports and culture committee to look into issues of the Ghana Football Association.

Personal life 
Agyekum is married with four children. He is a Christian and fellowships at Methodist.

References

Ghanaian MPs 2017–2021
1962 births
Living people
New Patriotic Party politicians